Arman Sabir is an investigative Pakistani journalist. He was the Secretary of the Karachi Press Club in 2019 and 2020. He is now working for the Weekly Bol News English as Senior Correspondent and based in Karachi. Before joining the newspaper in February 2022, he worked for ARY News from 2014 to 2022. Before that he was associated with the BBC Urdu Service for almost six years. Earlier he remained posted at the capital city of Islamabad from December 2009 to May 2012 after he was promoted to producer. He had joined the BBC Urdu Service as a correspondent in August 2007.

He was earlier affiliated with the widely circulated English-language daily newspaper Dawn in Pakistan from 1999 to 2007. Born in Karachi, the commercial hub of Pakistan, he got his master's degree in mass communications from the University of Karachi.

Work 
He has written various investigative articles on criminal justice system in Pakistan. He also writes on the issues of national identity cards, transport, and law enforcement agencies. He started his career in 1993 from a wire service, Pakistan Press International (PPI) and later joined the newspaper in 1999.

Sabir has covered one of the worst cyclones that hit the coastal areas of southern Pakistan province of Sindh in 1999.
He highlighted the gathering of female sex workers at a Karachi's hotel organized by an NGO to create awareness among them about safe sex. It was the first such program organised for female sex workers in the Islamic Republic of Pakistan, where prostitution is illegal.

He has visited the south-eastern district of Khokhrapar bordering Indian Rajasthan in February 2006 where a new railway station has been built on the Pakistan side at zero point. He has written on the revival of railway link between India and Pakistan after a pause of 40 years. He went to Balochistan after the torrential rains to cover the damaged section of the newly built Makran Coastal Highway in 2007.

In radio journalism 

Sabir was elevated to producer from the reporter in August 2009 and sent to Islamabad to carry out radio programmes. In Islamabad, he prepared a lot of radio programmes. He floated the idea of Jail reforms in Pakistan and a whole programme for an hour on radio broadcast was made on the idea.

Pakistan suffered a massive flood in 2009. The BBC Urdu in Islamabad launched a special radio programme for flood victims. It was a one-month project but it lasted for several months due to its popularity. The programme consisted of three bulletins of ten minutes each on FM partner stations. The programme called "Lifeline Pakistan" was supervised by Arman Sabir and Ahmed Raza, with the team head Shafi Naqi Jamie. Arman Sabir and Ahmed Raza trained the new members for two months and later the programme was handed over to the new team.

In online journalism 

Sabir was sent to Online desk in June 2011. His duty was to update the bbcurdu.com and refresh it with new incoming stories. His duty also includes to edit stories coming from reporters besides assigning reporters with innovative ideas. In May 2012, he was sent back to Karachi.

Membership 
Arman Sabir was the Secretary of the Karachi Press Club. He was elected again on December 28, 2019, for the second consecutive one-year term for KPC Elections 2020 and served till December 26, 2020. He secured 846 votes of the total eligible votes of 1476 against his opponent Faizan Lakhani of GEO who got 312 votes. Earlier, Arman Sabir was elected as secretary securing the highest votes of 925 of the total eligible votes of 1582 for the KPC Elections 2019. His opponent got 251 votes in the annual elections held on December 29, 2018. Arman Sabir was elected as Treasurer for 2013 election in the Karachi Press Club. He has been elected five times as a member of the Governing Body of the Karachi Press Club. He has been secretary of different committees of the KPC including of canteen committee, vigilance committee, Internet committee besides he remained member of various committees.

He is the member of the Karachi Union of Journalists as well and has served as the Secretary of the KUJ in 2009.

Visits 
He went to the United States in the year 2004 to report on the US presidential election campaign. He visited swing states such as Texas, Washington, and Ohio. He also went to Washington D.C. and Massachusetts. The visit was arranged by the US State Department.

References

External links 
Sabir's articles on BBC Urdu 
Sabir's articles published in Dawn
Arman Sabir on Twitter
Arman Sabir on Facebook

Pakistani writers
Pakistani male journalists
Pakistani investigative journalists
Living people
BBC newsreaders and journalists
University of Karachi alumni
1966 births